Chenaru (also Romanized as Chenārū and Chenaroo; also known as Chenārūyeh) is a village in Horgan Rural District, in the Central District of Neyriz County, Fars Province, Iran. At the 2006 census, its population was 40, in 13 families.

References 

Populated places in Neyriz County